The Stade Michel-Amand, formerly the Stade de la Pépinière, is a stadium in Poitiers, France. It is currently used for football matches and is the home stadium of Stade Poitevin FC. It has a capacity of 12,000.

References

External links
  
Stadium information

Buildings and structures in Poitiers
Michel-Amand
Sports venues completed in 1989
Sports venues in Vienne
Stade Poitevin FC